Several anthologies of religious poetry have been published by Oxford University Press.

Oxford Book of English Mystical Verse (1921)

The Oxford Book of English Mystical Verse was a poetry anthology edited by Daniel Howard Sinclair Nicholson and Arthur Hugh Evelyn Lee, and published in 1921 by the Oxford University Press. The compilation contains much religious verse, mainly from English Christian traditions, and some from other religions.

Present are poems by A. E. Waite and the young Aleister Crowley. Lee, an Anglican clergyman, associated with Waite. Nicholson later published a work on mysticism and St. Francis of Assisi. They both joined the Hermetic Order of the Golden Dawn, Lee in 1908, and Nicholson in 1910; both were friends of Charles Williams.

Eclecticism is shown by the presence of: Alfred Gurney, a clerical friend of Christina Rossetti; Edward Carpenter, Fabian socialist and homosexual; Frederic W. H. Myers, academic and psychic researcher; John Addington Symonds, aesthete; Walter Leslie Wilmshurst, writer on freemasonry and Wagner; Darrell Figgis, better known as a novelist and Sinn Féin member; George Santayana, the philosopher; Fred G. Bowles who was a Tin Pan Alley lyricist.

The poets included in The Oxford Book of English Mystical Verse were:

Oxford Book of Christian Verse (1940)

Edited by Lord David Cecil. Poets included were:

New Oxford Book of Christian Verse (1981)

Edited by Donald Davie. Poets included were:

Notes

External links
 The Oxford Book of English Mystical Verse online at Bartleby.com

British poetry anthologies
Religious books
Religious poetry anthologies, Oxford
Religious poetry
1917 poetry books
1940 poetry books
1981 poetry books